Neville Brody,  (born 23 April 1957) is an English graphic designer, typographer and art director. He is known for his work on The Face magazine (1981–1986), Arena magazine (1987–1990), and designing record covers for artists such as Clock DVA, Cabaret Voltaire, The Bongos, 23 Skidoo and Depeche Mode. He created the company Research Studios in 1994 and is a founding member of Fontworks. His work is included in the permanent collection of the Museum of Modern Art (MoMA). He was the Dean of the School of Communication at the Royal College of Art, London until September 2018. He is now Professor of Communication.

Early life and education
Brody was born in Southgate, London. He attended Minchenden Grammar School and studied A-Level Art, very much from a fine art viewpoint. In 1975 Brody went on to do a Fine Art foundation course at Hornsey College of Art. 

In Autumn 1976, Brody started a three-year BA course in graphics at the London College of Printing. His work was influenced by the emergence of punk rock in London life. He designed posters for student concerts at the college, most notably for Pere Ubu, supported by The Human League.

His first-year thesis was based around a comparison between Dadaism and pop art.

1980s: Art Direction
Brody's experimentation with his self-made sans-serif typography, along with his Pop Art and Dadaism influence, caught the attention of music record companies such as Fetish Records and Stiff records after he left college. His record cover designs largely consist of work with grunge and punk rock bands. The album Micro-Phonies by Cabaret Voltaire was art directed by Brody in 1984. His infamous typography features on the front and a bandaged figure spouting liquid from the mouth stares blankly at the viewer.

Brody was art director for The Face magazine. He directed the art design of other newspapers and magazines including City Limits, Lei, Per Lui, Actuel and Arena, as well as the redesigns of British newspapers The Guardian and The Observer. 

In 1988 Thames & Hudson published the first of two volumes about his work, which became the world's best selling graphic design book. Combined sales now exceed 120,000. An accompanying exhibition of his work at the Victoria and Albert Museum attracted over 40,000 visitors before touring Europe and Japan.

In 1991, Neville Brody and Jon Wozencroft created the FUSE project. FUSE is an interactive magazine that sets out to challenge our current ideas about typographic and visual language in an age of ever changing communications technology and media. Brody was also partly responsible for instigating the fusion between a magazine, graphics design and typeface design. The magazine ranges in themes from "Codes" and "Runes" to "Religion" and "Pornography." the exploration and freedom that the publishers exhibit is undeniable and exciting. The conventions upturned in FUSE are prescient in their definition of new standards.
Each package includes a publication with articles relating to typography and surrounding subjects, as well as new font designs. In 1990 he also founded the FontFont typeface library together with Erik Spiekermann.

Notable fonts include the updated font for the Times newspaper, Times Modern, New Deal as used in publicity material and titles for the film Public Enemies and Industria.

Brody launched Research Studios with Fwa Richards in London in 1994. A sister company, Research Publishing, produces and publishes experimental multi-media works by young artists. The primary focus is on FUSE, the conference and quarterly forum for experimental typography and communications. The publication is approaching its 20th issue over a publishing period of over ten years. Three FUSE conferences have so far been held, in London, San Francisco and Berlin. The conferences bring together speakers from design, architecture, sound, film and interactive design and web.

Recent projects include the redesign of the BBC in September 2011, The Times in November 2006 with the creation of a new font Times Modern. The typeface shares many visual similarities with Mercury designed by Jonathan Hoefler. It is the first new font at the newspaper since it introduced Times New Roman in 1932.

The company also completed a visual identity project for the Paris contemporary art exhibition Nuit Blanche in 2006. Research Studios launched a new look for the champagne brand Dom Pérignon in February 2007, having been appointed in 2004 to help the brand with its strategy and repositioning. 

As of 2017, the Welsh WJEC exam board included Neville Brody as part of their Graphic Design curriculum.

In 2021, Brody joined the advisory board of Dogamí, a blockchain-based "Petaverse" game, in which users "adopt" dog-inspired non-fungible tokens.

Work

Music

Fetish Records

Art Director (1980)

Your Mum, Album Cover (1981)
Bush Tetras, "Das Ah Riot/Boom", Single Cover (1981)
The Bongos, Time and the River, EP Cover (1981)
The Bongos, "Zebra Club", Single Cover (1981)
The Bongos, "In The Congo/Hunting/Mambo Sun", Single Cover (1981)
Clock DVA, "4 Hours", Single Cover (1981)
Clock DVA, Thirst, Album Cover (1981)
23 Skidoo, The Gospel Comes To New Guinea/Last Words, Single cover (1981)
23 Skidoo, Seven Songs, Album Cover (1982)
23 Skidoo, Tearing Up The Plans, EP cover (1981)
Throbbing Gristle, Five Albums Album Cover (1982)
8 Eyed Spy, "Diddy Wah Diddy" Single Cover (1982)
Z'EV, "Wipe Out/Element L" Single Cover (1982)
Stephen Mallinder, Pow Wow Album Cover (1982)
Various Artists, Last Testament Album Cover (1982)

Cabaret Voltaire

Numerous T-shirt, badge and poster designs.
"3 Crepuscule Tracks" 12" Single Cover (1981)
"Red Mecca" Album Cover (1981)
"Crackdown/Just Fascination" 12" Single Cover (1983)
"Just Fascination" 7" Single Cover (1983)
"James Brown" 12" Single Cover (1984)
"Microphonies" Album Cover (1984)
"The Covenant, The Sword and the Arm of the Lord" Album Cover (1985)
"Code" Album Cover (1987)

Other

23 Skidoo, "The Culling Is Coming" Album Cover (1983)
23 Skidoo, Coup, Single cover (1984)
23 Skidoo, Urban Gamelan, Album cover (1984)
23 Skidoo, Language, Single cover (1984)
23 Skidoo, Thoughts Of You, Single cover (1985)
23 Skidoo, Beyond Time, Album cover (2013)
Defunkt, "The Razor's Edge" 12" Single Cover (1982)
Depeche Mode, "Just Can't Get Enough" Single Cover (1982)
Level 42, "Standing in the Light" Album Cover (1983)
Level 42, "Micro-Kid" Single Cover (1983)
Elephant Talk, Album Cover (1983)
Kurtis Blow, "Party Time" 12" single Cover, Club Records (1985)
Jamie J. Morgan, Shotgun Album cover
Raybeats, "Holiday Inn Spain/Cocktails" 7" single cover on Don't Fall Off The Mountain label (1981)
Zuice, "Everyone A Winner" Album Cover (1986)
Zuice, "I'm Burning" Album Cover (1987)
Zuice, "Bless Your Lucky Stars  " Album Cover (1987)
Zuice, "shought owt to all the run it straight crew an all mah dirty-30 ninjas out der tongan crip souljah 4 life" Album Cover (1987)

Magazine work

1981–1986 Art director for The Face magazine
1987–1990 Art director for Arena magazine.

Misc

1990 – Opened FontWorks and became the director of FontShop International
1994 Founds Research Studios
Postage stamps by Neville Brody
2010 - "global visual language" (GVL) to establish consistency across BBC websites - starting with Doctor Who and BBC News
2010 Collaborates with Masha Ma in an art-fashion crossover installation at the Get It Louder art bienalle in Beijing.

Accomplishments
Design for Tribeca Issey Miyake in New York with Frank Gehry
Major contributor to FUSE, an influential publication on experimental typography
London's Victoria & Albert Museum hosted an exhibition of Brody's work
D&AD President's Award 2011

Fonts by Brody

Brody has designed 23 font families, including:

 Arcadia
 FF Autotrace
 FF Blur
 BF Bonn
 BF Buffalo
 FF Dirty 1
 FF Dirty 2
 FF Dirty 3
 FF Dirty 4
 FF Dirty 6
 FF Dirty 6.9
 FF Dirty 7
 FF Dirty 7.2
 FF Dirty 7.9
 FF Dome
 FF Gothic
 FF Harlem
 Industria
 Insignia
 FF Meta Subnormal
 FF Pop
 FF Tokyo
 FF Typeface 4
 FF Typeface 6 & 7
 FF Tyson
 FF World

References

The Graphic Language Of Neville Brody, Jon Wozencroft (1988) 
The Graphic Language of Neville Brody 2, Jon Wozencroft (1994)

External links

Apple Profile of Neville Brody
Biography at Research Studios
Biography and list of his typefaces at FontFont
Neville Brody at TYPO Berlin 96 conference: »Where's the beef?« as video

1957 births
English graphic designers
Alumni of Middlesex University
Living people
People from Southgate, London
English art directors
Academics of the Royal College of Art
Alumni of the London College of Communication
Royal Designers for Industry